Laura Bassi (formerly Polar Queen and RRS Ernest Shackleton) is an icebreaking research vessel operated by the Italian National Institute for Oceanography and Applied Geophysics, (in Italian: Istituto Nazionale di Oceanografia e di Geofisica Sperimentale - OGS). Between 1999 and 2019, she was the British Antarctic Survey (BAS) logistics ship, primarily used for the resupply of scientific stations in the Antarctic.

History
Launched in July 1995 as MV Polar Queen for GC Rieber Shipping, she was operated in the Antarctic by other national programmes. The BAS acquired her on a long-term bareboat charter in August 1999 to replace . She was renamed RRS Ernest Shackleton in 2000, after the Anglo-Irish polar explorer Sir Ernest Shackleton, but was known to users as "The Shack". After 20 years of polar duties for BAS, Ernest Shackleton was returned to her owners on 30 April 2019.

OGS (Istituto Nazionale di Oceanografia e di Geofisica Sperimentale) acquired the ship on 9 May 2019. They renamed her RV Laura Bassi, in honour of the first woman to earn a professorship in physics at a university and the first woman in the world to be appointed a university chair in a scientific field of studies. In February 2023, she set a record by becoming the first vessel to sail further south in the Antarctica than any ship has done before.

Construction
N/R Laura Bassi is ice strengthened with a double hull construction. In November 2020, she was certified Category A PC5 according to the Polar Code rules. She is capable of a wide range of logistic tasks, as well as having a scientific capability.

Service
Between 1999 and 2019, RRS Ernest Shackleton was the main logistic ship for the BAS. She was used to resupply the survey's Antarctic research stations and also had a research capability. "Tula", a cargo tender stored on deck, allowed transfer ashore of stores and equipment when the ship could not berth alongside. During the northern summer, she was commercially chartered, often working in the North Sea. On charter to Crystal Cruise Line, she escorted its 68,000 ton liner Crystal Serenity through Canada's Northwest Passage in late August/September 2016 and 2017. In the austral summer 2019/2020, she carried out the first Antarctic mission under the Italian flag, completing two rotations between New Zealand and Zucchelli Station, the Italian Antarctic base.

See also
 , another former British Antarctic Survey Royal Research Ship.
 , a new Royal Research Ship which entered service in 2021.

References

External links
 Image of RRS Ernest Shackleton on the British Antarctic Survey website.

Ships built in Norway
Icebreakers of the United Kingdom
Research vessels of the United Kingdom
1995 ships
British Antarctic Survey